Heliamphora ciliata is a species of Marsh Pitcher Plant endemic to Venezuela. It is restricted to a small number of swampy meadows in the uplands of Gran Sabana. In this habitat it is sympatric with a species of  Stegolepis (Rapateaceae). Unusually for the genus, H. ciliata is a submontane plant, growing at an elevation of only 900 m.

References

Further reading

  Fleischmann, A. & J.R. Grande Allende 2012 ['2011']. Taxonomía de Heliamphora minor Gleason (Sarraceniaceae) del Auyán-tepui, incluyendo una nueva variedad. [Taxonomy of Heliamphora minor Gleason (Sarraceniaceae) from Auyán-tepui, including a new variety.] Acta Botánica Venezuelica 34(1): 1–11.

External links
 Habitat photographs of Heliamphora ciliata

ciliata
Endemic flora of Venezuela
Carnivorous plants of South America
Plants described in 2009
Flora of the Tepuis